The 2016–17 Division 1 Féminine season was the 43rd edition since its establishment. Lyon were the defending champions, having won the title in each of the past ten seasons. The season began on 11 September 2016.

Lyon finished in first place, making it their eleventh straight title.

Teams

There were three promoted teams from the Division 2 Féminine, the second level of women's football in France, replacing the three teams that were relegated from the Division 1 Féminine following the 2015–16 season. A total of 12 teams competed in the league with two clubs suffering relegation to the second division at the end of the season.

Teams promoted to 2016–17 Division 1 Féminine
 Bordeaux
 Marseille
 Metz

Teams relegated to 2016–17 Division 2 Féminine
 La Roche-sur-Yon
 Nîmes MG
 Saint-Maur

Stadia and locations

League table

Results

Season statistics

Top scorers

Top assists

Hat-tricks

5 Player scored 5 goals
4 Player scored 4 goals

References

External links
 Official website

Fra
2016
1